The AFC Futsal Asian Cup, previously the AFC Futsal Championship, is the premier international futsal competition for the Asian Football Confederation national teams. It was first held in 1999 and was played annually until 2008; since then it has been played biennially. From 2021, the tournament was rebranded from the AFC Futsal Championship to the AFC Futsal Asian Cup. It is also the qualification for the FIFA Futsal World Cup.

Iran and Japan are the dominant nations being the only two nations to have won the tournament and Iran is the only nation to have never finished outside the top four. Iran, champions of 12 of the 16 editions of the competition, won 7 straight editions before their streak was broken by Japan. Japan have won the other 4 editions of the competition.

Format

History

Results

Performance

* = Hosts

Medals (1999-2022)

Summary (1999-2022)

Participating
 Comprehensive team results by tournament
Legend

 – Champions
 – Runners-up
 – Third place
 – Fourth place
 – Semifinals
QF – Quarterfinals
R2 – Round 2
R1 – Round 1
Q – Qualified for upcoming tournament
  ••   – Qualified but withdrew
  •   – Did not qualify
  ×   – Did not enter
  ×   – Withdrew / Banned / Entry not accepted by FIFA
     – To be determined
     – Hosts

Qualified teams

Teams not yet to qualify for finals
The following thirteen teams which are current AFC members have never qualified for the AFC Futsal Asian Cup.

FIFA Futsal World Cup
Legends
1st – Champions
2nd – Runners-up
3rd – Third place
4th – Fourth place
QF – Quarterfinals
R2 – Round 2 (1989–2008, second group stage, top 8; 2012–present: knockout round of 16)
R1 – Round 1
     – Hosts

Q – Qualified for upcoming tournament

Awards

Most Valuable Players

Top Scorers

Best Goalkeeper

Fair Play Award

Total Awards (1999-2022)

Best Wins (1999-2022)

All Rounds (Wins with 10 and +10 GD)

Quarter-final

Semi-final

Third Place

Final

+40 Minutes Matches

AET Matches
Matches that result defined in overtime (without penalty kicks) = AET

PSO Matches
Matches that result defined in penalty kicks = PSO

Notes

See also
 FIFA Futsal World Cup
 AFC U-20 Futsal Asian Cup
 AFC Futsal Club Championship
 AFC Women's Futsal Asian Cup

References

External links
 AFC Futsal Asian Cup
 RSSSF – AFC Futsal Championship

 
Futsal
International futsal competitions
Futsal competitions in Asia
Asian championships
1999 establishments in Asia
Recurring sporting events established in 1999